Qzone is a social networking website based in China which was created by Tencent in 2005. It allows users to write blogs, keep diaries, send photos,  listen to music, and watch videos. Users can set their Qzone background and select accessories based on their preferences so that every Qzone is customized to the individual member's taste. However, most Qzone accessories are not free; only after buying the "Canary Yellow Diamond" can users access every service without paying extra.

According to a 2009 report published by Tencent, Qzone was surpassing other social networking websites in China. Qzone is rapidly growing: as of November 2013, it already had 623.3 million users and by 2014 it had 645 million. 150 million Qzone users update their accounts at least once a month. As of 2009, this made Qzone one of the most active communities in the whole industry.

History 

Qzone started in April 2005 as an interior service within the Tencent company. The name was originally "Little Home Zone" in Tencent company. In 2008, Qzone was taken by Zhu Liang. This year, QQ registered users have reached 490 million, and about 200 million are active users. Qzone is positioned by Tencent as virtualization products along with QQ Show and QQ pet.

At the very beginning, the reference object of Qzone is not a social network, but blog products. "In 2005, Chinese blog market has been the rise of this market. Sina blog and MSN Space are two major competitors that we have. But Tencent did not have such power on media propagation, only relying on contents has no advantage. MSN spaces have a random combination of functional modules. The function of Space Decoration in Qzone was similar to it, and later on, we found the commercial value of it." Until now, the "Yellow Diamond System",  Space Decoration still dominate. Qzone gradually transformed from a personal space, where users can customize blogs, keep diaries, post photos, watch videos and listen to music, to one of the China's biggest social network.

Qzone is set by Tencent as a bonded service to QQ. Recently as the rise of social networks based on mobile platform such as WeChat, Qzone is seeing a decline.

Features

Certified Space 
Certified Space is Tencent page that officially certified by Tencent as well-known brands, agencies, e-commerce, application providers, web media, and celebrities. Certified space is a more advanced version of the ordinary Qzone, which adds some features and modules. The most notable feature is "I like" function, which allow user to follow up news from their favorite brands, agencies, media or celebrity. All updates of the certified space will display in information center of fans'. Certified Space users can launch various activities to maintain continuous and smooth interaction with their fans.

Own Space Decoration (Chinese: "空间装扮") 
Users can set the background of their own space. Ordinary users can use the free background, while paid or open "Yellow diamond" users can use more backgrounds. Users can custom style settings, Module Manager, making new module, "my items", and "Restore Default".

Background music 
Users can set the background music. There are two versions, which are aimed for "Green Diamond" users and ordinary users. "Green Diamond" users can enjoy genuine background music. Ordinary users can upload online music, but with a lower connecting quality.

Qzone Album 
Qzone album is the user's personal photo exhibition and storage platform. All users have free access to album feature, and QQ "Yellow Diamond" users and members can enjoy free access to larger space.

Features of Qzone Album

Number of albums 
Users can create up to 1,000 albums, each album can hold 10,000 photos.

Capacity of albums 
Ordinary users have basic space size of 3GB for albums, and getting more space is possible. "Yellow Diamond" users and members can have 25GB-500GB space for album according to their level.

Qzone Application Center 
Users can add games from Application Center to their homepage, and play with their friends in Qzone. There are not only games available in Application Center, but also social, entertainment and utilities applications.

Expert in Cities (Chinese: "城市达人") 
This feature is for people who are experts in a particular area of the city. Qzone's "Expert in Cities" provides a platform for all users to show their talent and expertise. Users who join "Expert in Cities" will be able to find like-minded friends, and let more people get to know them.

Qzone stopped this service on January 20, 2013.

Versions and key improvements

Censorship 
Qzone is known to employ a variety of  censorship methods, depending on the specific nature and level of sensitivity of the content being censored.

In strict cases, a user is prevented from posting at all. Upon clicking “publish,” the tester is presented with an error message of some form, with varying degrees of explanation but usually implying that the content was sensitive in some way. Details are never given, providing an explanation as to what exactly the offending content was or why it was unpublishable. Industry sources have confirmed that posts censored in this way are blocked via an automated system triggered by keywords, phrases, or even whole passages that are plugged into the system by administrators.

In less strict cases, posts may be "held for moderation". Upon clicking “publish,” the user is presented with a message indicating that the content is being held for approval, apparently the result of an automated process triggered by the use of keywords. This often happened on the same services that have also prevented publication of other posts, indicating that some services categorize different types of content at different sensitivity levels, to be handled differently. In some cases the content held for moderation was eventually published, indicating that a human being reviewed it and determined that the content was acceptable. In other cases the content was “held for moderation” indefinitely.

Posts may be successfully published at first, but deleted or "unpublished" some time later - usually within approximately 24 hours, although over weekends it could sometimes take as long as two days before a blog post would be taken down. Industry sources have confirmed that in these cases the content is flagged by the internal software system due to the presence of keywords. It is then reviewed by someone who then decides whether to remove, or un–publish, the post in question.

QZone, allows blocked posts to be published in “private view” (visible only to the author when logged in) but the post is not publicly visible. In its place appears a message: “This message is being previewed, which will take 3 working days. Once approved it will be possible to view normally.” The post never appears if it is indeed blocked, however.

Profits 
The revenue and profit of Qzone mainly comes from its VIP service - "Canary Yellow Diamond". It's a monthly payment, and users with it can fully take advantage of basic services. In addition to advertising, the site makes money off selling virtual items, using a coin system called “Q” coins. Q coins are purchased by real money. There are many add-on services in social games such as QQ farm. In order to get higher rank in QQ farm, Yellow Diamond users can earn advanced equipment for the game without extra fee. It's estimated that there are 653 million monthly active users in the third quarter of 2015. Apart from the "Canary Yellow Diamond", Qzone is also making money by platform distributions to different games as well as advertisements. The platform distribution profit comes from the gaming gainsharing.

See also 
Tencent QQ

References

External links

Chinese social networking websites
Tencent
Internet properties established in 2005
2005 establishments in China